Richard Friberg (born 5 May 1967) is a Swedish economist specializing in industrial organization, international trade, and risk management. He is the Jacob Wallenberg professor of economics at the Stockholm School of Economics.

Education 
Friberg completed a MSc. in Business and Economics (1992) and Ph.D. (1997) at the Stockholm School of Economics (SSE). His dissertation was titled Prices, profits and exchange rate uncertainty. Friberg's doctoral advisor was Robert Feenstra. He was a Fulbright scholar  from August 1994 to Jun 1995 at the Massachusetts Institute of Technology. He was a postdoctoral researcher at the SSE from 1998 to 2000.

Career 
Friberg is an economist specializing in industrial organization, international trade, and risk management. He became an assistant professor at SSE in 2000. Friberg became an associate professor (docent) in 2001 and a full professor in 2008. He was selected as the Jacob Wallenberg professor of economics in 2009.

From 2009 to 2013, Friberg was editor of The Scandinavian Journal of Economics.

Personal life 
Since 1997 Friberg has been married to Magdalena Andersson, the prime minister of Sweden from 2021 to 2022; they have two children. He and his wife are avid outdoors people; they often go hiking, kayaking and mountaineering.

Selected works

References

External links
 

|-

|-

|-

Living people
Place of birth missing (living people)
21st-century Swedish economists
Stockholm School of Economics alumni
Academic staff of the Stockholm School of Economics
Spouses of prime ministers of Sweden
1967 births